Thorpe Hesley F.C. was an English football club based in Thorpe Hesley, Rotherham, West Riding of Yorkshire.

History 
Thorpe Hesley were formed at the outset of the 20th century, entering the Hatchard League for the first time in 1902. Two years later they made their FA Cup debut, reaching the 2nd qualifying round, an achievement they would equal in 1906 (being disqualified after a replay with Hoyland Town). The club disbanded in 1911.

League and cup history 

* League play-off winners** League play-off runners-up

Notable former players 
Players that have played in the Football League either before or after playing for Thorpe Hesley –

 George Stacey
 Bert Cook
 Bernard Willkinson

Honours

League 
 Hatchard League champions: 1907–08, 1908–09
 Runners-up: 1902–03

Records 
 Best FA Cup performance: 2nd Qualifying Round, 1905-05, 1906–07

References 

Defunct football clubs in South Yorkshire
Hatchard League
Sheffield Association League
Association football clubs established in the 20th century
Association football clubs disestablished in 1911